First Blood Last Cuts is the first compilation album by the American heavy metal band W.A.S.P. Released in October 1993, it was the first time the song "Animal (Fuck Like a Beast)", previously only released as a single in 1984, was released on an album. The album also included two new songs, "Sunset and Babylon" and "Rock and Roll to Death". "Rock and Roll to Death" was later released on 1995's Still Not Black Enough, with "Sunset and Babylon" remaining exclusive to this CD, while others songs were remixed for the album.

The compilation is the result of Blackie Lawless and W.A.S.P. leaving Capitol Records and was released as a contractual obligation with Capitol/EMI. According to Blackie Lawless, "Capitol had gotten to the point that they were no longer going to be the label that supported this kind of music."

Track listing 
All songs written by Blackie Lawless, except where noted.

Track 1: Previously only available as a single, released Summer 1984
Tracks 2, 3 & 4: From the debut album W.A.S.P., released August 8, 1984
Tracks 5 & 6: From the album The Last Command, released November 9, 1985
Track 7: From the album Inside the Electric Circus, released November 8, 1986
Tracks 8, 9, 10, & 11: From the album The Headless Children, released April 15, 1989
Tracks 12, 13 & 15: From the album The Crimson Idol, released June 8, 1992
Tracks 14 & 16: Recorded exclusively for this album

References

W.A.S.P. albums
1993 compilation albums
Capitol Records compilation albums
Albums produced by Blackie Lawless